The Mahjong International League (Chinese: "国际麻将联盟") is the international governing body of mahjong.  Its registered office is located in Lausanne, Switzerland. As of 2016, its president is Frank Ng from Hong Kong.

History

Establishment
The Mahjong International League (MIL) was founded in 2015, and it was registered in Lausanne, Switzerland. "Mahjong International League Establishment Ceremony" was held on May 11, 2015 in Diaoyutai State Guest Hotel in Beijing, China.

World Mahjong Sports Games
The 1st World Mahjong Sports Games (WMSG) was held from 24 to 28 October 2015, in the city of Sanya, Hainan Province, China.

Bo Tang from China won the individual competition, and Team Chinese B won the team competition.

Recognition of IMSA
On February 26, 2016, MIL was recognized as an observer by International Mind Sport Association (IMSA) after a presentation by Frank Ng, the president of MIL. As of 5 April 2017 Mahjong is the sixth official game to be played at IMSA Elite Games.

Members (36)
In June 2021:

Asia (10)

Europe (14)

Americas (7)

Africa (3)

Oceania (2)

See also
Mahjong
World Mahjong Organization (WMO)
World Mahjong Sports Games

References

External links
Mahjong International League

Mahjong organizations